Pentachlorofluoroethane is a chlorofluorocarbon once used as a propellant and refrigerant.  Its production and consumption has been banned since January 1, 1996 in developed countries, and January 1, 2010 in developing countries under the Montreal Protocol because of its ozone-depleting potential.

References

Chlorofluorocarbons